E74 like ETS transcription factor 3 is a protein that in humans is encoded by the ELF3 gene.

References

Further reading